= Mother and Child on a Hammock =

Painting

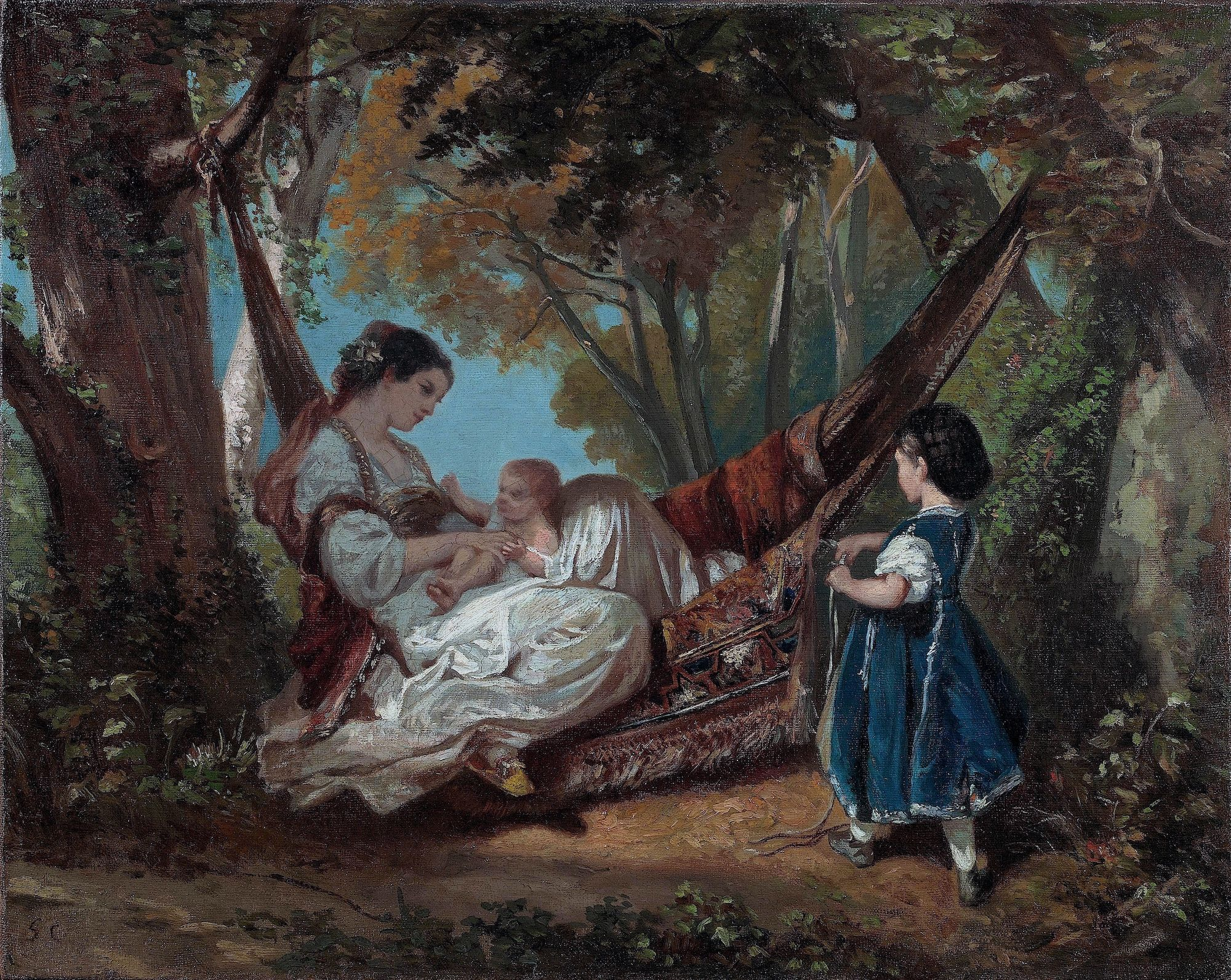
- Artist: Gustave Courbet
- Year: c. 1848
- Medium: Oil on canvas
- Dimensions: 32 cm × 40.5 cm (13 in × 15.9 in)
- Location: Private collection

Mother and Child on a Hammock is a painting by French painter Gustave Courbet, completed circa 1848, thought to depict his mistress, Virginie Binet, with whom he had a son. Its ownership is under investigation by the United States Department of Justice as of November 2025.
